The Pennsylvania Attorney General election of 2016 took place on November 8, 2016, to elect a new Pennsylvania Attorney General. Democratic incumbent Kathleen Kane originally indicated her intention to seek re-election, but dropped out after she was criminally charged with violating grand jury secrecy laws stemming from alleged leaks of grand jury investigation details to embarrass a political enemy. Democratic nominee and Montgomery County Commissioner Josh Shapiro defeated Republican state senator John Rafferty Jr. by a margin of 2.78%.

Democratic primary

Candidates

Declared
 John Morganelli, Northampton County District Attorney, candidate in 2000 and 2004 and nominee in 2008
 Josh Shapiro, chairman of the Montgomery County Board of Supervisors and former state representative
 Stephen Zappala, Allegheny County District Attorney

Withdrawn
 David Fawcett, former Allegheny County Councilman
 Kathleen Kane, incumbent attorney general
 Jack Stollsteimer, former Delaware County Assistant District Attorney and former Assistant United States Attorney

Endorsements

Polling

Results

Republican primary

Candidates

Declared
 Joe Peters, former federal and state prosecutor and nominee for Pennsylvania Auditor General in 2004
 John Rafferty, state senator

Withdrawn
 Todd Stephens, state representative

Declined
Heather Heidelbaugh, former Allegheny County Councilwoman

Results

General election

Predictions

Results

References

External links 
Official campaign websites
 Dave Fawcett for Attorney General
 Joe Peters for Attorney General
 John Rafferty for Attorney General
 Josh Shapiro for Attorney General
 Todd Stephens for Attorney General
 Jack Stollsteimer for Attorney General
 Stephen Zappala for Attorney General

Attorney General
Pennsylvania Attorney General elections
Pennsylvania
Josh Shapiro